Candid Records was a jazz record label first established in New York City.

Early Candid Records
The CANDID jazz label was founded in New York City in 1960 as a subsidiary of Cadence Records, owned by Archie Bleyer. The jazz writer and civil rights activist Nat Hentoff was the label's (A&R) director and, consequently, he attempted to create a catalog that represented the prevalent jazz music of the day. Hentoff also worked with the graphic designer and photographer Frank Gauna to create Candid's distinctive album covers.

Candid's catalog included Don Ellis, Abbey Lincoln, Booker Little, Charles Mingus, and Cecil Taylor. Later, the label was acquired by pop singer Andy Williams, who either reissued the catalog on his own Barnaby label or licensed them to foreign record companies into the 1970s and late 1980s.

The Cadence-era Discography

The 34 Cadence-era LPs

In 1964, due to its financial difficulties, Archie Bleyer opted to shut down Cadence Records, parent company of Candid Records and sold the complete Cadence catalog (inclusive of the Candid Records recordings) to the singer, Andy Williams, owner of Barnaby Records.

Post-Cadence Italian/German/British Candid Records

Candid Records UK

In 1989, the Candid recordings were bought by Black Lion Records, which reissued the vintage material on CDs and produced new recordings succeedingly. The new Candid Records (UK) catalogue expanded to include Greg Abate, Kenny Barron, Luis Bonilla, Art Hodes, Lee Konitz, Dave Liebman, Shorty Rogers and Bud Shank, Mongo Santamaría, Shirley Scott and a host of new jazz talent.

External links
JAZZDISCO.org Candid Records Discography Project
The Candid Records Birka Jazz Archive
Barnaby Records, Album Discography
Candid Records, Illustrated Discography

References

American record labels
American jazz record labels
Jazz record labels
Record labels established in 1960
Record labels disestablished in 1961